The Belle Stars were an all female British pop/rock band.  Formed in 1980, they are best known for their 1983 hit single "Sign of the Times".

Career
After The Bodysnatchers broke up, guitarists Stella Barker and Sarah-Jane Owen, saxophonist Miranda Joyce, keyboardist Penny Leyton, and drummer Judy Parsons decided to form a new band, recruiting bass player Lesley Shone and lead vocalist Jennie Matthias (also known as Jennie Bellestar). Their first performance was on Christmas Day 1980, before they had chosen a name.

Within a short time, the group became well-known around London, notably appearing on the front cover of Sounds magazine early in 1981. Shortly thereafter, they were signed by Stiff Records, then highly successful through its star act, Madness. 

The band's debut single, "Hiawatha", was released in the late spring of 1981; it was produced by Madness producers Clive Langer and Alan Winstanley. The band promoted the single by playing support slots at gigs by ska acts The Beat and Madness. However, the single failed to chart, despite continuing media attention. In May 1981, the band opened for The Clash on tour dates in Brussels, Lille, and Paris.

The same production team were responsible for "Slick Trick", the second single. It too failed to chart. Keyboard player Penny Leyton left the band late in the year, to be replaced on saxophone and keyboards by Clare Hirst.

When the third single, the radio-friendly "Another Latin Love Song" again failed to break into the chart, the band tried cover versions instead, with some success. "Iko Iko", a cover of The Dixie Cups' 1965 hit (later featured in the 1988 movie Rain Man), was The Belle Stars' long-hoped-for UK Singles Chart debut, peaking at number 35 in June 1982. This single was  released at the same time as another version by Natasha England, whose version went on to reach the UK Top Ten. The Belle Stars furthered this with "The Clapping Song" (their first top 20 hit), a remake of the 1965 Shirley Ellis hit, and then "Mockingbird", a hit for Inez and Charlie Foxx in 1963 and James Taylor and Carly Simon in 1974. 

In January 1983, the Belle Stars released what would be their signature single, "Sign of the Times", peaking at number three, and a chart success throughout Europe. The song's music video, showing the Belle Stars in dinner jackets, was also played frequently by MTV in the United States. The song went on to become the 30th-best selling single of 1983 in the UK. "Sign of the Times" was produced by Peter Collins for Loose Ends Productions, a company managed by Pete Waterman before he became famous as a third of the Stock/Aitken/Waterman production team. A Canadian all female studio vocal trio known as "Men's Room" covered "Sign of the Times" in 1983 almost exactly as the original, taking their version to number nine in Canada while the Belle Stars' version did not chart there.

"Sign of the Times" was followed a month later by the band's eponymous debut album, which reached number 15 on the UK Albums Chart. As with the band's singles, it was a mix of original songs and cover versions, including Bob and Earl's "Harlem Shuffle" (covered three years later by the Rolling Stones on Dirty Work) and Al Wilson's "The Snake".

However, "Sign of the Times" proved to be the peak of the band's success. Each follow-up single was less successful than its predecessor: "Sweet Memory" reached number 22 in the chart in April 1983; "Indian Summer" number 52 in August; whilst "The Entertainer" did not chart. It took another year before the band had a minor hit, "80's Romance", which made number 71 in August 1984 before it dropped out after a week. Despite this, the band continued to tour throughout Europe. However, the lack of success took its toll, and Matthias left the band, followed by others, until the band was down to Owen, Joyce, and Shone. Owen became the 'de facto' lead vocalist, though all three members often sang in unison, in the style of Bananarama.

Stiff Records was ailing by 1984, and it merged with Island Records; in July 1985 it was liquidated and bought by ZTT, the label owned by the husband-and-wife team of producer Trevor Horn and Jill Sinclair. Under Horn's supervision, the three remaining members recorded a new Belle Stars album in New York City with the 4th & Broadway production team. However, the only tracks to be released were those on the single "World Domination", which flopped in Britain but peaked at number two for two weeks on the Billboard Hot Dance/Disco chart in the US. Following this release, the band broke up.

However, in March 1989, the Belle Stars finally had a big US chart hit, when "Iko Iko" reached number 14 on the Billboard Top 100 after it was included on the soundtrack of the film Rain Man, starring Tom Cruise and Dustin Hoffman. The song had been a favourite of Hoffman's. Matthias toured the US to promote the song.

Leyton went on to join the all-girl ska band The Deltones in 1984; they released an album on Unicorn Records in 1989.

Matthias guested on the 1973 (2007) and Decadent (2008) albums by Skaville UK. In about 2008, she formed a new ska band with Lee Thompson from Madness called The Dance Brigade; and then formed her own band, 1-Stop-Experience, with Skip McDonald, Paget King and Chico Chigas; they disbanded in 2013. She also performed at the Let's Rock 2019 festival.

In September 2019, four previously unreleased Belle Stars songs from the Anne Dudley sessions for the second album, and a live concert from 1983, were included in a comprehensive box set, Turn Back the Clock from Edsel Records.

Personnel
 Jennie Matthias: lead vocals (1981–1984)
 Sarah Jane Owen: lead guitar, vocals
 Stella Barker: rhythm guitar, percussion, vocals (1981–1984)
 Lesley Shone: bass, vocals
 Judy Parsons: drums, percussion (1981–1984)
 Miranda Joyce: alto saxophone, percussion, vocals
 Penny Leyton: keyboards, piano (1981–1982)
 Clare Hirst: tenor saxophone, keyboards, piano, vocals (1982–1984) Fabian Figueroa Diaz

Discography

Albums

Singles and EPs

References

 Webb Joey (2004). Belle Issima! Sweet Memories. Edsel
 Belle Stars (1983–1986). BS Bandits – official Belle Stars fanzines
 Michaels Randolph, (2005). Flashbacks to Happiness: Eighties Music Revisited''. iUniverse Publishing.

External links
 The Belle Stars fansite

English pop music groups
English new wave musical groups
British new wave girl groups
Musical groups established in 1980
Musical groups disestablished in 1986
Musical groups from London
Stiff Records artists
British rock girl groups
All-female bands